The Swiss Cottage, Rockfield, Monmouthshire is a gatehouse to The Hendre estate and was designed by Sir Aston Webb in 1905. It is a Grade II* listed building.

History and description
The Hendre was the country home of the Rolls family since the 18th century and, as the fortunes of the family rose, was subject to three major expansions in the 19th and 20th centuries, to the designs of George Vaughan Maddox, then Thomas Henry Wyatt, and finally Aston Webb. Webb constructed the Cedar Library at the main mansion in the very late 19th century and in 1905 designed the Swiss Cottage. It formed a terminal point on the “3-mile Drive” constructed by Lord Llangattock, and designed by Henry Ernest Milner.

The cottage is single-storeyed, with a dormer above, and is constructed of old red sandstone. The roof is hipped and pierced at either end with large chimneystacks. The interior contains an inglenook fireplace. Cadw notes influences from Lutyens and Voysey. The architectural historian John Newman  described Swiss Cottage as "a sweet little thing but not particularly Swiss".

Notes

References 
 
 

Buildings and structures in Monmouthshire
Grade II* listed buildings in Monmouthshire